Paul Denis is a politician in Haiti and the Haitian Justice Minister from 11 November 2009 to 27 June 2011. He also served as one-third of the Tripartite Council which appointed the seven-member Council of Sages which took power in the immediate aftermath of the 2004 Haiti Rebellion which overthrew former president Jean-Bertrand Aristide, of which Denis was a vocal opponent.

The 2010 Haiti earthquake destroyed the Ministry of Justice building and Denis, who was working in his office at the time, was one of several politicians initially reported dead.
 

However, Denis had been able to exit the building in time but many of his staffers and advisers were killed.

Before the quake, he had been campaigning in the presidential phase of the 2006 Haitian elections on behalf of the OPL.

References

Government ministers of Haiti
Year of birth missing (living people)
Living people
Struggling People's Organization politicians
Candidates for President of Haiti